The Long Island Rail Road owns an electric fleet of 132 M9, 836 M7, and 170 M3 electric multiple unit cars, and a diesel and diesel-electric fleet consisting of 134 C3 bilevel rail cars powered by 24 DE30AC diesel-electric locomotives and 20 DM30AC dual-mode locomotives.

History
When the LIRR began operations in 1836, it leased the newly opened Brooklyn and Jamaica Railroad, including its two duplicate steam locomotives, Ariel and Post Boy, both built by Matthias W. Baldwin. (Ariel was Baldwin's 19th engine, built in 1835.) The LIRR soon acquired, through the B&J, Hicksville in 1836 and John A. King (the only engine built by the Poughkeepsie Locomotive Company) in 1838. Post Boy was sold off after an 1852 accident. Both the "Hicksville" and the "John A. King" were likely acquired second hand by the B & J in 1836 and 1838, respectively.

The "Hicksville" was acquired by the B & J in 1836 from a canal building concern "Proprietors of Locks and Canals", based in Lowell, Massachusetts. This company is still in existence. According to Robert Stephenson and Company records, in the year 1831, the firm of "Locks And Canals" purchased two locomotives new from the Robert Stephenson Company (order # 8 and 17) in England. It is likely the B & J purchased one of those two engines, second hand, from Locks And Canals in 1836, and renamed it the "Hicksville" (after Valentine Hicks, second President of the LIRR, and founder of Hicksville, NY). It is also likely, that at some point prior to its re- sale to the B & J, the engine in question was modified to Stephenson's famous 2-2-2 wheel arrangement.

According to "The History Of Brooklyn", by Hazelton, ca. 1920s, the LIRR acquired a second hand locomotive originally named the "Taglioni" from "the Dutchess County (NY) Railway, of British origin, with a large funnel smokestack". This is likely to be the "John A. King". The "Poughkeepsie Locomotive Works" may have only performed a wheel arrangement modification on a pre existing British built locomotive. Poughkeepsie is also located in Dutchess County New York, hence the possible entity name confusion in the Hazelton book.

Long before modern piggyback services, the LIRR began carrying farm wagons aboard flatcars in 1885.

In the early 20th century, the LIRR was a testing ground for the Pennsylvania Railroad's electrification, including Phoebe, its first electric (AA1), and was the first company to extensively electrify its primary lines. The DD1 electric locomotives were developed from the prototypes that were tested on LIRR trackage. Later it saw power such as the B3.

The LIRR's steam passenger locomotives were modernized from 1901 to 1906, and by 1927, it was the first Class I railroad to replace all its wood passenger cars with steel.

In 1926, the LIRR was the first U.S. railroad to begin using diesel locomotives. The last steam locomotive was a G5s operated until 1955.

Electric storage battery cars were used on the West Hempstead Branch (Valley Stream to Mineola) from 1913 until it was electrified in 1926, and on the Bushwick Branch prior to the end of its passenger operations in 1924. The Central Branch from Garden City east to Mitchel Field was electrified with third rail in 1915, but used ex-Ocean Electric Railway trolley cars until 1933. Normal electric trains, such as the MP41 were then used until 1950, when they were replaced by MP54's until the line's abandonment in 1953.

One of the most popular decisions by Governor Nelson A. Rockefeller after the 1966 takeover was replacing the entire electric passenger fleet with M1 cars. It acquired 770 M1 cars built by Budd and General Electric from 1968 to 1974, and 174 M3 cars, built  in 1985 and 1986, also by the Budd Company.

Diesel-hauled trains through the late 1990s were operated using 1950s-era P72/PT75 series coaches built by Pullman-Standard. One end of the train was often powered by 28 EMD GP38-2 and 23 MP15AC diesel-electric locomotives, pulling a total of about 223 passenger cars, mostly former electric multiple units. For the other end of the train, the LIRR used a number of older locomotives converted to "power packs", in which the original prime movers were replaced with  engines/generators solely for supplying HEP (head-end power for the lights and heating)  with the engineer's control stand left intact. Locomotives converted included Alco FA-1s and FA-2s, EMD F7s, and one F9. One individual power pack was further converted into a power car for the C1 bilevel cars in the 1990s. The power packs were later sold to other operators, preserved in museums, or scrapped.

In 1997 and 1998, the LIRR received 134 double-decker C3 passenger cars from Kawasaki, including 23 cab control cars, and 46 General Motors Electro-Motive Division diesel-electric locomotives (23 diesel DE30ACs and 23 dual-mode DM30ACs) to pull them, allowing trains from non-electric territory to access Penn Station for the first time in many years, due to the prohibition on diesel operation in the East River Tunnels leading to Penn Station. They were also the first trains with computerized voices (complete with LED sign displays) announcing stations along the routes. However, over the years of service the automated announcements and LED displays often fell into disrepair, consequently requiring the conductors to make announcements.

Starting in 1999, the LIRR bought 836 new electric M7 electric multiple units from Bombardier, replacing its M1 cars. These cars have an automatic station announcement and LED sign display system. Delivery started in the early 2000s, with the first ones beginning revenue service in October 2002.

On September 19, 2013, it was announced that the LIRR would procure new M9/M9A cars from Kawasaki. This procurement includes a firm initial order of 92 cars. Given sufficient funding, another 324 cars will be ordered.  The cars will replace the M3s and expand the fleet in preparation for service to Grand Central Madison via East Side Access. The cars are being assembled at Kawasaki's plant in Lincoln, Nebraska. The first M9s entered revenue service debut on September 11, 2019. As of June 2022, 132 M9s have been delivered to the LIRR, and their procurement was nearly three years behind schedule.

For the summer of 2017, the LIRR leased 8 single-level coaches from MARC in order to free up their C3 coaches for the Montauk Branch.

The automated announcements provided on the C3 and M7 railcars are voiced by WALL radio host Van Ritshie.

Active rolling stock

Locomotives

Push-pull coaches

Electric multiple units

References

Long Island Rail Road
Rolling stock of the United States